Pa Di  is a Southwestern Tai language of the Chinese–Vietnamese border. There are about 300 Pa Di speakers in Muong Khuong District, Lao Cai Province, Vietnam, who are classified as ethnic Tày by the Vietnamese government. Pa Di tonal splits are similar to those of Standard Thai.

Jerold Edmondson reports about 300 speakers. However, Bùi Quốc Khánh (2013) reports 3,000 Pa Dí people living in 19 natural villages in Mường Khương, Tung Trung Phố, and Nậm Chảy communes of Mường Khương District.

References

Sources
Bùi Quốc Khánh. 2013. Tri thức dân gian trong canh tác cây lúa nước của người Pa Dí ở Lào Cai. Nhà xuất bản Thời Đại. 
Ngô Đức Thịnh (1975). "Mấy ý kiến góp phần xác minh người Pa Dí ở Mường Khương (Lào Cai)". In, Ủy ban khoa học xã hội Việt Nam: Viện dân tộc học. Về vấn đề xác định thánh phần các dân tộc thiểu số ở miền bắc Việt Nam, 287-305. Hà Nội: Nhà xuất bản khoa học xã hội.

Southwestern Tai languages
Languages of Vietnam